Robert James Spagnoletti is the former Attorney General of the District of Columbia, United States, appointed 2004. He previously served as District of Columbia Corporation Counsel, and as an Assistant United States Attorney for the District of Columbia. He announced in late 2006 that he was leaving that office in 2006 to work at a private D.C. law firm, Schertler & Onorato LLP. He served a one-year term as President of the District of Columbia Bar beginning in June 2008 and became chief executive officer in May 2017.

Education
J.D., Georgetown University Law Center
Bachelor's degree, Lafayette College

Personal
Spagnoletti is openly gay and lives with his partner and their two sons.

References

External links

Meet The President: Robert J. Spagnoletti, Washington Lawyer, July/August 2008

Living people
District of Columbia Attorneys General
Lafayette College alumni
Georgetown University Law Center alumni
Assistant United States Attorneys
1962 births